Martin Chovan (born 20 August 1986) is a Slovak professional ice hockey defenceman who is currently playing for HC Nové Zámky of the Slovak Extraliga.

Career
Chovan began playing at junior level for HC Oceláři Třinec before turning pro with ŠHK 37 Piešťany of the Slovak 1. Liga in 2004. The following season, Chovan made his Tipsport Liga debut for HK 36 Skalica during the 2005–06 season where he played three games.

After spells in the Slovak 1. Liga with Piešťany and HK 91 Senica as well in the Czech 1. Liga for LHK Jestřábi Prostějov, Chovan joined HK Dukla Trenčín in 2008. He spent three and a half years with Trenčín, Chovan moved to HC Košice during the 2011–12 season. He then moved to MsHK Žilina during the 2013–14 season.

The following season, Chovan moved to Kazakhstan, splitting the season with Saryarka Karagandy in the Supreme Hockey League and Yertis Pavlodar in the Kazakhstan Hockey Championship. He then returned to Slovakia with HC Nové Zámky of the 1. Liga on September 4, 2015. On October 3, 2017, Chovan left Nové Zámky and joined HC 07 Detva three days later.

Career statistics

Regular season and playoffs

References

External links

1986 births
Living people
HC 07 Detva players
HK Dukla Trenčín players
LHK Jestřábi Prostějov players
HC Košice players
HC Nové Zámky players
ŠHK 37 Piešťany players
Saryarka Karagandy players
HK 36 Skalica players
Slovak ice hockey defencemen
Ice hockey people from Bratislava
Yertis Pavlodar players
MsHK Žilina players
HK Poprad players
Bratislava Capitals players
Slovak expatriate ice hockey players in the Czech Republic
Expatriate ice hockey players in Kazakhstan
Slovak expatriate sportspeople in Kazakhstan